Eattupara is a small village in the Western Ghats of Himalayas, in the Kannur district of Kerala State in India. It is a pilgrim centre of St. Alphonsa in northern Kerala. The anniversary of Saint Alphonsa's death, which falls on 28 July, is an important day for the devotees. Eattupara and its surrounds are hilly areas and have a lot of vegetation.

References

Villages near Payyanur